Porqueros is a locality and minor local entity located in the municipality of Magaz de Cepeda, in León province, Castile and León, Spain. As of 2020, it has a population of 53.

Geography 
Porqueros is located 68km west of León, Spain.

References

Populated places in the Province of León